Albert "Aldo" Bensadoun (born 1939), is a Canadian billionaire businessman. He is the founder and executive chairman of the ALDO Group, a retail shoe company based in Montreal, Quebec, Canada. Bensadoun's family foundation donated $25 million to McGill University to help found the Bensadoun School of Retail Management.

Early life 
Born in Fez to a Moroccan Jewish family, his father was a shoe retailer in Fez, Morocco and France. Bensadoun moved to the United States for his post-secondary education. He attended Cornell University before relocating to Montreal and graduating from McGill University with a commerce degree in 1964.

Career
He worked at Yellow Shoes before founding the precursor to the Aldo Group in 1972 as a stand within the Le Château store in Montreal.

Honours
Bensadoun is a recipient of the Order of Canada. He is a recipient of the National Order of Quebec, and the Ordre de Montréal.

Personal life
Bensadoun has been married twice. His first wife was a Scottish Protestant; they had two sons: David (born 1970) and Douglas (born 1973). His second wife is Dianne Bibeau; they have a daughter, Daniela (born 1991). His son David is the CEO of the Aldo Group  and is married to Isabelle Poirier.

In 2012, his son, David, along with Patrick Beaule were the first Canadian four wheel team to complete the Dakar Rally.

References

1939 births
Living people
Businesspeople from Montreal
Jewish Canadian philanthropists
Knights of the National Order of Quebec
Cornell University alumni
McGill University Faculty of Management alumni
Moroccan emigrants to Canada
20th-century Moroccan Jews